Conn O'Neill was a member of the O'Neill dynasty, the most powerful Gaelic family in Ireland. He was the youngest son of Hugh O'Neill, Earl of Tyrone who had initially been a supporter of the Crown but led Tyrone's Rebellion between 1594–1603. He then made peace and was restored to royal favour following the Treaty of Mellifont. Conn's mother was Catherine O'Neill, Countess of Tyrone, from the Magennis family of Iveagh.

Conn was left behind when Tyrone, his wife Catherine and other supporters departed Ireland during the Flight of the Earls in 1607. He was taken into the custody of the Crown and was taken to England and attended Eton College. However, Conn quickly became the focus of plots to make him the figurehead of an uprising, notably the Ulster Conspiracy of 1615. For security reasons he was taken out of Eton and transferred to the Tower of London to prevent a further outbreak of violence in Ireland similar to O'Doherty's Rebellion in 1608.

Following the death of three of his elder brothers in exile, Conn moved up the line of succession. His father died in Rome in 1616, and Conn's elder brother John O'Neill succeeded him. Conn was held in the Tower with a number of his relatives of the O'Neill and O'Donnell dynasties and may have lived in some comfort as was common for a nobleman. It is not known exactly when he died, or whether he was ever released. The last record of him is from 1622.

References

Bibliography
 Casway, Jerrold. Owen Roe O'Neill and the Struggle for Catholic Ireland. University of Pennsylvania Press, 1984.
 McCavitt, John. The Flight of the Earls. Gill & MacMillan, 2002.
 Morgan, Hiram. Tyrone's Rebellion. Boydell Press, 1999.

O'Neill dynasty
17th-century Irish people
People from County Tyrone
People educated at Eton College
Prisoners in the Tower of London
Flight of the Earls
Prisoners and detainees of England and Wales
People of the Nine Years' War (Ireland)